Jochen Gaudenzi (born 9 June 1978) is an Austrian football manager and former footballer who played as a midfielder.

External links
 

1978 births
Living people
Austrian footballers
Association football midfielders